Henry Santos Jeter (born Henry Santos on December 15, 1979) is a Dominican singer, songwriter, and producer. Best known for his tenure as a singer and songwriter in the bachata group Aventura. He made his debut as a solo artist in 2011.

Early life
Santos was born in 1979, in Moca, Espaillat, Dominican Republic. He moved with his family to the Bronx, NY, at age of 13. He is the cousin of bachata star Romeo Santos, with whom he co-founded Los Tinellers in 1994 in what would later become the group known today as Aventura. When he was 17, he became an American citizen and then changed his last name from Santos, which now is his middle name, to Jeter. Santos explained that the Yankees are his favorite baseball team. At the time, Derek Jeter had just started and Santos was so hyped about him to the point that he legally changed his name to Henry Santos Jeter.

Music career

With Aventura

Santos was a singer, songwriter, and producer for the band. He and Anthony "Romeo" Santos have written several hits for the band such as "Deja Vu", "Voy Mal Acostumbrado", "9:15" and "Princesita". Originally known as "Los Tinellers", the group made its full-length debut with “Trampa De Amor” in 1995. Aventura became recognized worldwide with the smash hit "Obsesión" from their third album, We Broke The Rules (2002). Aventura's success was elevated by "Ella Y Yo", a collaboration with the reggaeton artist Don Omar from their fifth Studio album God's Project (2005). It was the first of ten straight top ten hits on the Billboard Hot Latin Songs chart. After nine albums (six studio and three live efforts) Aventura announced their separation in 2011. Later that year, Henry Santos & Romeo released solo albums.

Santos would eventually have multiple reunions with his group over the years. First time it happened on July 12, 2014, 3 Years after the split, he reunited with his old bandmates Lenny, Max & Anthony in a surprise reunion of Aventura during Romeo Santos' historic sold out concert at Yankee Stadium. On February 4, 2016, Henry Santos would reunite with Aventura for a 21-day concert series at the United Palace in New York City.

On September 21. 2019, he reunited again with the group at his cousin Romeo Santos' sold out concert at MetLife Stadium to close the show. Later that year they had announced the Inmortal Tour. From February to March 2020, Aventura tour around the United States until the Covid 19 Pandemic. Shows were cancelled and the group wasn’t able to finish the tour. They eventually would return in 2021 in which they did many Stadium shows in the United States. The last concert of the tour was on October 9th, 2021 at Metlife Stadium in New Jersey. Their last 2 shows together were On December 18th and 19th, 2021 in Dominican Republic. Both shows were a huge success.

Solo career
In 2011, Santos released his debut solo album, "Introducing Henry Santos". It debuted at number 2 on the Billboard Tropical Albums Chart. Hits such as "Poquito A Poquito", "Por Amor (Mi Fiel Fanatica)" and "Por Nada" were favorites among worldwide bachata listeners.

In 2013 Santos released his second studio album My Way. It included the single Bésame Siempre and two singles that positioned at number-one on the Billboard Tropical Airplay chart which are "My Way" and "La Vida". On April 22, 2013, it was announced on Billboard's Tropical Charts & Nielsen charts that "My Way", Henry Santos' first single off his second solo album, became number one in the USA radio Airwaves of the Tropical Charts, positioning him as one of the favorites in the Latin market. On June 25, 2013, his second solo album was released under exclusive licensing to VeneMusic & Universal Music Group, executive produced by HustleHard Ent. called "Henry Santos' My Way". On April 14, 2014, TR3S launched an exclusive campaign featuring Henry Santos' third video La Vida, in collaboration with Latin Grammy award winning producer Maffio.

In 2015, after the disappearance of Siente Music, the label that represented Santos (collaboration between Venemusic & Universal Music Group), Henry continued his independent solo career under his own record label (HustleHard Entertainment LLC) releasing two successful productions.

On April 8, 2016, he released his third studio album, "Henry The Third Deluxe". It debuted at #7 in the iTunes digital charts. This album includes hits such as "Y Eres Tan Bella", "Quédate", "Ella Me Dijo", "Ella Tiene Mareo" & "Si Me Besa Tu Boca".

On February 24, 2017, he released his first live solo album The Live Album: Sólo Éxitos". This is a live album compilation of Henry Santos' best songs. I also included all the songs that included his voice from his time in Aventura. From Henry Santos' solo breakout hit "Poquito A Poquito" to one of the most popular Grupo Aventura tracks performed at 2011's Festival Viña Del Mar "Nueve & Quince", we're are able to relive all the glorious moments of Henry Santos' 20-year music career.

On June 1, 2018, his fourth studio album was released titled "Shut Up & Listen" spawning the hits "Descarados", "Algo Estúpido", "Tu Ego", "Aún No Es Tarde", "Once Mil Cosas" among others.

On February 8, 2019, "Reto: Canta Con Henry Santos Vol.1" was released worldwide. It's a karaoke album for fans to sing to. He released Vol. 2 (Los Clásicos) (The Classics) on January 24, 2020.

On May 3, 2019, "Don Juan & Cupido" featuring Anthony "El Mayimbe" Santos was released. This is the first single of Henry Santos' 5th studio album, Friends & Legends, which was released in 2021. Later that year he released the single "Weekend" November 15, 2019, featuring Daniel Santacruz & Lirow.

In 2021 he released Friends & Legends where he was able to record tracks with legends in the Bachata genre such as Anthony Santos, Luis Vargas, Joe Veras, Alexandra, as well as colleagues & newcomers. This also included the salsa song "Mambo" which features Dominican salsa singer David Kada. It peaked at number #10
on the Billboard Tropical Airplay chart.

On February 4, 2022, he released the bachata version of "Te Di" with Pavel Núñez. "Te Di" is originally a pop song by Pavel Núñez from his 2012 album Paso A Paso. On May 20, 2022 he released "Cuando Te Toco" with JFab, and Paola Fabre.

Acting
Henry Santos have make cameos in two successful Dominican movies,  Sanky Panky and La Soga. Santos was the music supervisor of La Soga.  He also hosted a fictional radio station called San Juan sounds in the biggest video game franchise Grand Theft Auto: The Ballad of Gay Tony.  He is the lead actor in Por Nada, A Musical Film a 30-minute short film linked to the second single "Por Nada" of his Introducing Henry Santos solo debut album.

Discography

Studio albums
 Introducing Henry Santos (2011)
 My Way (2013)
 The Third (2016)
 Shut Up & Listen (2018)
 Friends & Legends (2021)

Live albums
 The Live Album: Sólo Éxitos (2017)

Karaoke albums
 Reto: Canta Con Henry Santos, Vol.1 (2019)
 Reto: Canta Con Henry Santos, Vol.2 (Los Clásicos) (2020)

Singles

Mira Quien Baila
In September 2012, it was announced that Henry Santos would be the first dancer from the Dominican Republic involved in the third season of Mira Quien Baila, Univision's Spanish version of Dancing with the Stars. He would be competing in support of the National Latino Children's institute. Week after week, Santos dominated every challenge given to him on the dance floor. The dances ranged from Hip-Hop and Salsa, to Tango and Quickstep. Not only did Santos dominate the dance floor, but his charm and charisma heavily attracted the fans, which made the third season of Mira Quien Baila the highest rated season in history. Santos made it to the finale without ever being nominated for elimination, setting a new record for the show. Mira Quien Baila's finale aired November 18, 2012. The episode was seen by over seven million people worldwide. Santos was crowned by the fans "El Rey de la Pista" (King of the Dance Floor) with over 41% of the votes against Alicia Machado and Fernando Arau.

Community work
Competing in Mira Quien Baila, Henry Santos represented the National Latino Children's institute as support for the organization. But that was no't his only contribution in terms of community work.

On May 6, 2014, Santos partnered up with NYC Presbyterian Hospital & Columbia University in the fight against child obesity in the United States with their community program "Vive Tu Vida" by CHALK, offering a healthy alternatives menu in restaurants all over NYC and educating Latinos on recommended portion sizes for foods, the benefits of exercising and a healthier lifestyle. Subsequently, Santos represented his foundation in the popular Telemundo cooking competition Top Chef Estrellas with the purpose of spreading the message.

On May 14, 2014, Santos was named the "Padrino" (Godfather) of the Latino Commission on AIDS in the United States, helping spread the word among Latin people on the fight against this illness. Subsequently, his voice and image were used on the CDC & MTV's Tr3s Campaign, "Una Conversation A La Vez" ("One Conversation at a Time"), educating Latin people on the prevention of HIV/AIDS.

References

1979 births
Aventura (band) members
Living people
People from Espaillat Province
Bachata singers
Dominican Republic emigrants to the United States
Dominican Republic songwriters
Male songwriters
Entertainers from the Bronx
21st-century Dominican Republic male singers